Silent Fear is a 1956 American adventure film directed by Edward L. Cahn and written by Steve Fisher. The film stars Andrea King, Peter Adams, Henry Brandon, Malcolm Atterbury, José Treviño and Enrique Zambrano. The film was released by Gibraltar Motion Picture Distributors Inc. on February 8, 1956.

Plot

Cast          
Andrea King as Terry Perreau
Peter Adams as Pete Carroll
Henry Brandon as Cliff Sutton
Malcolm Atterbury as Dr. Vernon
José Treviño as Ricardo Mendoza
Enrique Zambrano as Dr. Antez
Ramón Sánchez as Thursday
Víctor Alcocer as Cortez
Charles Rooner as Rudolph
Carlos Múzquiz as Detective
Eduardo Alcaraz as Dr. Rivas
José Muñoz as Manuel

References

External links
 

1956 films
1950s English-language films
American adventure films
1956 adventure films
Films directed by Edward L. Cahn
1950s American films
American black-and-white films